Natalia Zamilska, known professionally as Zamilska (born 1989 in Zawiercie) is a Polish creator, composer, DJ and producer of electronic music.

Life 

Natalia Zamilska was born in 1989 in Zawiercie. She graduated from Uniwersytet Śląski in Cieszyn with a degree in social and cultural animation. She cooperated with a local Foundation of Audiovisual Culture "Strefa Szarej", by leading workshops in electronic music production and working for Galeria Szara. After university she moved to Katowice where she concentrated on making music. In 2014 she moved to Warsaw.

In 2014 she debuted with an album Untune, which ranked 12 in the yearly toplist of The Quietus. Her music was used on a Dior fashion show. Her second album, an OST to the game Ruiner, was nominated in the Electronic Album Of The Year category of Fryderyki 2017 and Digital Dragons 2018 award for the best game soundtrack. Her work was recommended by Iggy Pop and Nine Inch Nails. In 2019 she released a LP Uncovered.

Zamilska also produces records. The track  "Dzielne kobiety" (Brave women) by Paulina Przybysz produced by Zamilska was a part of an album "Chodź tu" (Come here) which won a Fryderyk in 2017. She remixed, among others, Rita Pax, The Dumplings, Natalia Fiedorczuk, Quebonafide and Maria Peszek.

In the years 2017–2019 she was a host of a programme "Nocny TransPort" in national radio station Czwórka.

In 2016 she came out in an interview with Wysokie Obcasy, where she mentioned having a girlfriend.

Discography 
LPs

 2014 – Untune
 2017 – Ruiner Official Soundtrack [game soundtrack]
 2019 – Uncovered

EPs

 2016 – UNDONE

Singles

 2014 – Quarrel
 2014 – Quarrel II (Internal Defense)
 2016 – Closer
 2018 – Jeśli wiesz co chcę powiedzieć [remixes]; Nosowska & Zamilska
 2019 – Hollow

References

External links 

Website
Bandcamp profile
Facebook profile

University of Silesia in Katowice alumni
Techno musicians
Polish DJs
Polish women record producers
1989 births
Polish lesbian musicians
Women in electronic music
LGBT record producers
LGBT DJs
Living people